Samuel Antonio "Tony" Woods, Jr. (born January 24, 1990) is an American professional basketball player. Standing at 2.11 m (6'11"), he plays at the center position.

High school
Woods attended and played high school basketball Rome High School, in Rome, Georgia and attended Jordan Brand Classic on 2008.

College career
After graduating from Rome High School, Woods played two years of college basketball for Wake Forest University. After the being found guilty of domestic violence, Woods was subsequently expelled and enrolled in Oregon. He had to sit out one season under NCAA rules.

Professional career
On September 11, 2013, Woods joined Nea Kifissia of Greek Basket League.

With Nea Kifissia, he averaged 6.5 points and 4.2 rebounds per game, in 26 games,. He then continued his career in the Greek Basket League with Panionios.

With Panionios, Woods averaged 7 points and 4.9 rebounds per game. He continued his career with Apollon Patras.

Woods was the third leading scorer of Apollon Patras, in the Greek Basket League 2015–16 season, averaging 8.54 points per game.

On September 20, 2016, Woods joined the newly promoted Greek League team of Doxa Lefkadas, but he left the team without appearing in a single game with them. On January 4, 2017, he joined Rilski Sportist of the Bulgarian League. He left the team on March 31, 2017. On June 27, 2017, he joined Soles de Santo Domingo of the Puerto Rican Liga Nacional de Baloncesto.

He returned to Panionios for the 2017–18 season. Woods moved to Cyprus in 2019, signing with Omonoia. In six games he averaged 11.7 points, 11.3 rebounds, 1.2 assists, 1.2 steals and 1.8 blocks per game. Woods spent the 2019-20 season with Žilina of the Slovak Basketball League, averaging 6.3 points and 7.6 rebounds per game. On September 6, 2020, he signed with Ionikos Nikaias of the Greek Basket League.

References

External links
Twitter Account
Eurobasket.com Profile
Draftexpress.com Profile
ESPN.com Profile 
Oregon Ducks profile

1990 births
Living people
American expatriate basketball people in Bulgaria
American expatriate basketball people in Cyprus
American expatriate basketball people in the Dominican Republic
American expatriate basketball people in Greece
American expatriate basketball people in Romania
American men's basketball players
APOEL B.C. players
Apollon Patras B.C. players
Basketball players from Georgia (U.S. state)
BC Rilski Sportist players
Centers (basketball)
CS Energia Rovinari players
Nea Kifissia B.C. players
Oregon Ducks men's basketball players
Panionios B.C. players
Parade High School All-Americans (boys' basketball)
People from Rome, Georgia
Wake Forest Demon Deacons men's basketball players